Nucet is a town in Bihor County, western Transylvania, Romania. Its name means "walnut trees" both in Romanian and Hungarian. It administers two villages, Băița (Rézbánya) and Băița-Plai.

The uranium-producing Băița mine is located on the territory of the commune.

Demographics

Nucet has a population of 2,148 (2011 census), made up of Romanians (89.57%), Hungarians (3.44%), Roma (3.77%), and Germans (0.27%). It is the smallest town in Bihor County and the second smallest town in Romania; only Băile Tușnad is smaller than Nucet.

References

Populated places in Bihor County
Localities in Crișana
Towns in Romania
Monotowns in Romania
Socialist planned cities